Relax...It's Just Sex is a 1998 romantic comedy film directed by P. J. Castellaneta.

Premise
A diverse group of couples from different sexual orientations struggle and support each other through various issues, including violent hate crimes, HIV, conception, commitment, and love in 1990s Los Angeles.

References

External links 
 
 
 

1998 films
Bisexuality-related films
Female bisexuality in film
Lesbian-related films
1998 romantic comedy films
American LGBT-related films
American sex comedy films
American romantic comedy films
1998 LGBT-related films
Films about interracial romance
LGBT-related sex comedy films
LGBT-related romantic comedy films
1990s English-language films
1990s American films